Anine Stang (born 25 February 1985 Anine Victoria Stang) is a Norwegian singer and songwriter.

In 2007 Anine received her music degree from the prestigious songwriters academy Musikmakarna in Sweden. The same year she moved to Los Angeles, where she got a band together and wrote songs with several acclaimed musicians. She played sold-out concerts, in among others, the world-famous rock club "The Viper Room". In 2008 she got second place in a "battle of the bands" contest under the direction of LA Music Network and rock radio station FM 98.7. The judges stated that she had the best song out of all the contestants.

In 2008/2009 Anine was mentioned in the US based magazine Music Connection'''s  "Hot 100 unsigned artists" list.

After three years in Los Angeles, Anine goes back to her roots in Norway in 2010, getting a deal with Universal Music. 
Her first music video remained on the top 10 list on MTV for several weeks, and it even impressed the world-famous celebrity blogger, Perez Hilton.

The video for her single "Dominoes" was nominated for "Best Music Video" at UK Film Festival, and it won two prices: "Award of Excellence" and "Best Cinematography" at Los Angeles Movie Awards in January 2012.
 
Bill Siddons, ex-manager of The Doors, was Anine's mentor during the three years in L.A. She has worked closely with musicians who have also worked with artists such as Marilyn Manson, Rihanna, Lady Gaga, Guns N' Roses, Slipknot, Debbie Harry and Thirty Seconds to Mars.

Before Christmas 2010, she released the single "Christmas Card" in benefit of the Red Cross programme for children in need.

In 2011 she was handpicked by the Billboard hit making production team Stargate, to attend their masterclass in New York City. While in New York she played at Splash, New York's biggest gay club. This is the club where Lady Gaga started her career, and Madonna has played several times. The club wanted her back, and in the summer of 2011 she went on her first US tour.

Anine has chosen to go the long and hard school of the music industry to find her own unique style as an artist and songwriter. She is a "do it yourself" driven artist, involved in all parts of her career. In 2012 she went in a slightly different direction musically and released the songs "Brain Break" and "The Young" under the artist name "Anina".

She released the song "Brain Break" on her own label "Electric Stardust", in August 2012. The UK based Scandinavian music blog "Scandipop.co.uk" called it "[s]odding mental. But it's the kind of sodding mental that lends itself well to also being sodding brilliant".

The video for "Brain Break" also received favourable reviews.UK ScandiPop 2012-09-04

She currently resides in Los Angeles, California, working on new material expected to be released in 2017.

Discography
2017: "Badass Motherfucker"
2013: "The Young" (single) (as Anina) 
2012: "Brain Break" (single)(as Anina)
2011: "Dominoes" (single)
2010: "Christmascard" (single) 
2010: Hits for Kids, vol. 24'' – "Trying You On" (compilation) 
2010: "Dinnertime" (single) 
2010: "Trying You On" (single) 
2006: "Moments of Magic" (single) (under the artist name "Anine & Lasse")

References

External links
Official website: aninestang.com

Living people
Norwegian songwriters
Norwegian pop singers
Musicians from Oslo
1985 births
21st-century Norwegian singers